Blues Up & Down is an album by saxophonists Eddie "Lockjaw" Davis and Johnny Griffin recorded in 1961 and released on the Jazzland label.

Reception
The AllMusic site awarded the album 3 stars.

Track listing 
All compositions by Johnny Griffin, except as indicated.
 "Camp Meeting" - 5:26   
 "Blues Up and Down" (Gene Ammons, Sonny Stitt) - 5:03   
 "Nice and Easy" - 7:25   
 "Oh, Gee" (Matthew Gee) - 3:51   
 "Walkin'" (Richard Carpenter) - 6:56   
 "Leapin' On Lenox" (Eddie "Lockjaw" Davis) - 4:35   
 "Layin' On Mellow" (Griffin, Davis) - 4:48

Personnel 
Eddie "Lockjaw" Davis, Johnny Griffin - tenor saxophone
 Lloyd Mayers - piano
 Larry Gales - bass
 Ben Riley - drums

References 

1961 albums
Eddie "Lockjaw" Davis albums
Johnny Griffin albums
Albums produced by Orrin Keepnews
Jazzland Records (1960) albums